Rebecca "Becca" Gilmore (born February 15, 1998) is an American ice hockey forward, currently playing in the Premier Hockey Federation (PHF) with the Boston Pride. Her college ice hockey career was played with the Harvard Crimson women's ice hockey program in the ECAC Hockey conference of the NCAA Division I during the 2017–18 season through the 2021–22 season.

, she ranks seventh on the list of all-time career points scored by an American in the IIHF U18 Women's World Championship.

Playing career 
Gilmore attended the Noble and Greenough School in Dedham, Massachusetts for secondary school and played with the school's girls' ice hockey team. In 2017, she won the John Carlton Memorial Award and was also named to the Boston Herald All-Scholastic.

In the fall of 2017, she joined the women's ice hockey program of Harvard University. Gilmore notched two assists in her first NCAA games, going on to finish her rookie season with 35 points in 31 games, leading Harvard in scoring and being named to the ECAC All-Rookie Team. Her point production dropped slightly during her second year, down to 21 points in 26 games, as she missed part of the season due to injury. She would then score 24 points in 33 games during the 2019–20 season, including the game-winning goal to send Harvard to the ECAC Hockey semifinals for the first time since 2015. She was named ECAC Player of the Week for the last week of February 2020.

Professional 
Gilmore signed her first professional contract with the Boston Pride ahead of the 2022–23 PHF season. Her first PHF goal was scored off a wrist shot against Toronto Six goaltender Elaine Chuli on November 26, 2022.

International career 
As a member of the US national under-18 ice hockey team, Gilmore participated in the IIHF Women's U18 World Championships in 2014, 2015, and 2016, scoring a total of 19 points in 15 games and winning gold twice and silver once. She finished as the tournament's second-ranked scorer in 2015 after tying the scoring leader, Canada's Sarah Potomak, in points, with nine, but trailing her in goals scored, with two to Potomak's five.

References

External links
 
 

1998 births
Living people
American women's ice hockey forwards
Boston Pride players
Harvard Crimson women's ice hockey players
Ice hockey players from Massachusetts
People from Wayland, Massachusetts
Noble and Greenough School alumni
Sportspeople from Middlesex County, Massachusetts